Tiago André Leão Martins Nunes (born 24 August 1995 in Carvalhosa, Paços de Ferreira) is a Portuguese footballer who plays for S.C. Freamunde as a forward.

Football career
On 27 July 2014, Leão made his professional debut with Freamunde in a 2014–15 Taça da Liga match against Covilhã.

References

External links

Stats and profile at LPFP 

1995 births
Living people
Portuguese footballers
Association football forwards
S.C. Freamunde players
People from Paços de Ferreira
Sportspeople from Porto District